Wilfred Senanayake (10 November 1918 — 26 May 2008) was a Sri Lankan politician who served as member of Parliament for Homagama.

Biography 
He was educated at Nalanda College Colombo and later, unbeknownst to his parents, joined the army.

He joined the Lanka Sama Samaja Party and was the first Leftist chairman of the Village Council in his area. When LSSP members who were imprisoned by the British were released in 1945, Wilfred Senanayake took the initiative to organise rallies throughout the country. He led the Hartal in the Kelani Valley in 1953.

Career 
He was elected to Parliament from Homagama in 1970, in which capacity he built a reputation as a representative of the poor and ordinary people. He protested that the extent of lands that could be owned by one person should be limited to  while there was a suggestion that it be limited to  under the 1972 Land Reform.

In 1982, together with politicians Anil Moonesinghe, Cholomondely Goonewardena and G. E. H. Perera he formed the Sri Lanka Sama Samaja Party (SLSSP).

Legacy 
In appreciation of his yeoman service to the people of Homagama, the Wilfred Senanayake Ground was established there.

References

Lanka Sama Samaja Party politicians
Sri Lankan socialists
Sri Lankan Trotskyists
Members of the 7th Parliament of Ceylon
Sri Lankan Buddhists
Alumni of Nalanda College, Colombo
1918 births
2008 deaths
Sinhalese politicians
Sinhalese military personnel
Ceylonese military personnel of World War II